Nannocampus elegans, the elegant pipefish, is a species of pipefish native to the Western Indian Ocean.

See also 
 List of marine spiny-finned fishes of South Africa

References 

 Dawson, C.E., 1986. Syngnathidae. p. 445-458. In M.M. Smith and P.C. Heemstra (eds.) Smiths' sea fishes. Springer-Verlag, Berlin.

External links 

 Nannocampus elegans at fishBase

Syngnathidae
Fish described in 1953